Peter Gerald Charles Dickens DSO, MBE, DSC, RN (6 April 1917 – 25 May 1987) was a Royal Navy officer during World War II and a great-grandson of novelist Charles Dickens.

Life and career
The son of Admiral Sir Gerald Charles Dickens and Kathleen Pearl Birch, Peter Dickens was born in Fulham in London in 1917. Dickens joined the Royal Navy as a naval cadet in September 1934, being promoted to midshipman in May 1935, when he was serving aboard  in the Home Fleet. Dickens was acting sub-lieutenant in September 1937 and sub-lieutenant in May 1938 while serving aboard the Royal Yacht  in Portsmouth. In 1940 he took part in the evacuation from Dunkirk.

From June 1942, Dickens was the commanding officer of HM MTB 234 and the senior officer of 21st MTB Flotilla when, in August 1942, he was awarded the MBE for saving his mined ship through damage control, and the Distinguished Service Cross in December 1942 for attacks on enemy shipping. In July 1943 he was awarded the Distinguished Service Order for skillful and daring attacks "in enemy coastal waters".

He then transferred to the Staff of RN College, Eaton and later RN College, Dartmouth, where he served from July 1945 to 1948.
 
Dickens was captain of Chatham Dockyard and Queen's Harbour Master and chief staff officer to Rear Admiral Beloe between March 1961 to February 1964, and served as naval aide-de-camp to Queen Elizabeth II from July 1964 to January 1965.
 
Peter Dickens was the president of the Dickens Fellowship, a worldwide association of people who share an interest in the life and works of Charles Dickens, and was president of the Coastal Forces Association. With his wife, Mary Alice Blagrove (the daughter of Rear-Admiral Henry Blagrove), he is the grandfather of the actor Harry Lloyd and uncle to the actor/performer Gerald Charles Dickens.

Dickens died in 1987 at Tunbridge Wells in Kent.

Publications
'HMS Hesperus' Profile Publications (1972)
'Night Action : MTB Flotilla at War' Bantam Books (1974) 
'Narvik : Battles in the Fjords' Classics of Naval Literature. U.S. Naval Institute (1974) .
'SAS : the Jungle Frontier : 22 Special Air Service Regiment in the Borneo Campaign, 1963–1966' (1983)

Honours and awards
19 July 1940 – Mentioned in Dispatches – Lieutenant Peter Gerald Charles Dickens, Royal Navy – for naval operations off the coast of Norway.
11 June 1942 – Mentioned in Dispatches – Lieutenant Peter Gerald Charles Dickens, Royal Navy – As Celebration of His Majesty's Birthday, for outstanding zeal, patience and cheerfulness, and for never failing to set an example of wholehearted devotion to duty, without which the high tradition of the Royal Navy could not be upheld.
11 August 1942 – Member of the Order of the British Empire Lieutenant Peter Gerald Charles Dickens, Royal Navy – For bravery and devotion to duty.
29 December 1942 – Distinguished Service Cross – Lieutenant Peter Gerald Charles Dickens, M.B.E., Royal Navy – For courage and skill in attacks on enemy shipping off the French coast.
13 April 1943 – Mentioned in Dispatches – Lieutenant Peter Gerald Charles Dickens, M.B.E., D.S.C., Royal Navy – For good services in action against the enemy off the Dutch Coast.
22 June 1943 – Mentioned in Dispatches – Lieutenant Peter Gerald Charles Dickens, M.B.E., D.S.C., Royal Navy – For bravery and skill in a successful attack of enemy shipping, while serving in light coastal forces.
13 July 1943 – Companion of the Distinguished Service Order – Lieutenant Peter Gerald Charles Dickens, M.B.E., D.S.C., Royal Navy – For skill and daring in many successful attacks on enemy forces, made in enemy waters, while serving in light coastal craft.

See also
Dickens family

References

External links
Dickens's war service in Time Magazine
Dickens on Royal Navy Officers 1939-1945
Dickens and the 1949 Yangtze Incident

1917 births
1987 deaths
Royal Navy officers of World War II
Charles Dickens
English people of Czech-Jewish descent
Members of the Order of the British Empire
Companions of the Distinguished Service Order
Recipients of the Distinguished Service Cross (United Kingdom)
People from Fulham
20th-century English novelists